The men's long jump event at the 2008 World Junior Championships in Athletics was held in Bydgoszcz, Poland, at Zawisza Stadium on 8 and 9 July.

Medalists

Results

Final
9 July

Qualifications
8 July

Group A

Group B

Participation
According to an unofficial count, 30 athletes from 24 countries participated in the event.

References

Long jump
Long jump at the World Athletics U20 Championships